Ethical solipsism is relative to Ethical egoism; however, the difference is in that while the ethical egoist thinks that others should abide by the social order while it is in his/her best interest to do what best suits him/her as an individual, the Ethical Solipsist is of the belief that no other moral judgment exists or matters outside of his own individual moral judgment.

Alternatively, due to the Solipsistic uncertainty regarding the existence of external beings, he/she believes it necessary for all, (self included,) to adhere to the ethical and moral standards, for other beings may be real, and conscious.

Meta-ethics